Jonas Eriksson (born 28 March 1974) is a Swedish former football referee. He was a full international referee for FIFA between 2002 and 2018.

Career 
Eriksson became a professional referee in 1994 and has been an Allsvenskan referee since 2000. He has refereed 263 matches in Allsvenskan, 47 matches in Superettan and 112 international matches as of 2014.

In August 2013, Eriksson was chosen to referee 2013 UEFA Super Cup between Chelsea and Bayern Munich. He was called by FIFA to officiate in Brazil's 2014 FIFA World Cup. His first match in the World Cup was between the United States and Ghana. He was the fourth official at the 2015 UEFA Champions League Final match of Juventus vs. Barcelona at Olympiastadion in Berlin, Germany on 6 June 2015.

On 18 May 2016, he refereed the UEFA Europa League Final between Liverpool and Sevilla. His refereeing work was subjected to controversy after Liverpool's 3-1 defeat.

On 30 May 2018, it was announced he would end his career as a referee.

Personal life 
Eriksson resides in Sigtuna. He is reportedly a multi-millionaire.

See also 
 List of football referees

References

External links 
FIFA
SvFF 

1974 births
Living people
Swedish football referees
UEFA Champions League referees
UEFA Europa League referees
2014 FIFA World Cup referees
UEFA Euro 2012 referees
UEFA Euro 2016 referees